Judith Ann Whitworth  (born 1 April 1944) is an Australian medical researcher in the areas of kidney function and blood pressure. Now an Emeritus Professor, she is the former Director of the John Curtin School of Medical Research and Howard Florey Professor of Medical Research at the Australian National University (ANU).

Education 
Judith Ann Whitworth was born 1 April 1944. She graduated from the University of Melbourne with a degree in medicine in 1967 then worked first at Royal Melbourne Hospital and then the Queen Elizabeth Hospital in Adelaide. She was awarded Doctor of Medicine by the University of Melbourne in 1974.  Her 1977 thesis on "Steroids and Hypertension in the Sheep gained her a PhD from the Howard Florey Institute of Experimental Physiology and Medicine and Department of Physiology at the University of Melbourne.

In 1992, Whitworth received a DSc from the University of Melbourne for her thesis, "Steroid Hypertension in Man, Rat and Sheep."

Career 

Prior to her move to academia, Whitworth worked in hospitals both in Australia and overseas, including as Research Fellow at the Tenon Hospital in Paris, France in 1973-74 and as Visiting Registrar at Guys Hospital, London in 1974-75. She was first physician and later nephrologist at the Royal Melbourne Hospital 1978-1991. From 1994 to 1996 Whitworth was Chair of the Medical Research Committee of the National Health and Medical Research Council.

In 1997, Whitworth was the first woman to be appointed Chief Medical Officer in the Commonwealth Department of Health and Family Services for a three year term. She then became Director of the John Curtin School of Medical Research from August 1999 to July 2009. Alongside her academic responsibilities she was President of the High Blood Pressure Research Council of Australia from 1999 to 2001 and Chair of the World Health Organisation Global Advisory Committee on Health Research from 2005 to 2011.

Whitworth was honoured to present the Paddy Woolcock Lecture at the biennial Woolcock gala held by the Prince Charles Hospital Foundation in 2014. Earlier lectures had been given by Professor Peter Doherty and Professor Fiona Wood.

She has been a member of the Council of the Charles Darwin University from its inception in 2003 to date. She is on the Board of Therapeutic Innovation Australia and Chair of its Clinical Trials Infrastructure Committee.

Awards and honours
 Winthrop Travelling Fellowship from Royal Australasian College of Physicians, 1973
 Smith Kline and French Award received from the International Society of Hypertension, 1984
 Howard Florey Medal, 1990
 Appointed Companion of the Order of Australia (AC) in the 2001 Queen's Birthday Honours for "service to the advancement of academic medicine and as a major contributor to research policy and medical research administration in Australia and internationally".
 Received the Centenary Medal in 2001 "services to Australian society through medical research".
Appointed Honouring Woman ambassador by the Hon Amanda Vanstone in 2002.
 Telstra ACT Business Woman of the Year, 2002
 Australian of the Year for the Australian Capital Territory in 2004
 Awarded Doctor of Medicine (honoris causa) by the University of Sydney on 16 April 2004
 Awarded Honorary Doctor of Science by the University of Glasgow in 2008 
 Awarded Doctor of  Laws (honoris causa) by the University of Melbourne
 Elected Honorary Fellow of the Australian Academy of Health and Medical Sciences, 2015
 Elected Fellow of the Australian Academy of Technological Sciences and Engineering 2008
 Honorary Life Member of the Australian and New Zealand Society of Nephrology

Legacy 
The Judith Whitworth Fellowship for Gender Equity in Science was inaugurated in 2014 in recognition of her work at the Australian National University. It will provide early support for young scientists, particularly women, to take leave to care for their child.

Selected works

Personal life
Whitworth was the second wife of the late Professor John Ludbrook, (1929–2017), a medical researcher and surgeon. They had one daughter.

References

External links
 

1944 births
Living people
University of Melbourne alumni
Academic staff of the Australian National University
Companions of the Order of Australia
Recipients of the Centenary Medal
Australian women medical doctors
Australian medical doctors
Australian medical researchers
Australian nephrologists
Fellows of the Australian Academy of Technological Sciences and Engineering
Fellows of the Royal Australasian College of Physicians
20th-century Australian women
21st-century Australian women
21st-century Australian people
20th-century Australian scientists
21st-century Australian scientists
Fellows of the Australian Academy of Health and Medical Sciences